Miłogoszcz may refer to the following places in Poland:
Miłogoszcz, Lower Silesian Voivodeship (south-west Poland)
Miłogoszcz, Koszalin County in West Pomeranian Voivodeship (north-west Poland)
Miłogoszcz, Łobez County in West Pomeranian Voivodeship (north-west Poland)
Miłogoszcz, Wałcz County in West Pomeranian Voivodeship (north-west Poland)